Christopher Conyers, 2nd Baron Conyers.

Christopher Conyers is also the name of:

Sir Christopher Conyers, 2nd Baronet (1621–1693), of the Conyers baronets
Christopher Conyers of Hornby, owner of Crakehall c.1400 and ancestor of the Conyers baronets
Christopher Conyers (knight), English fifteenth-century Yorkist knight